This is a list of previous winners of the Prescott Cup which was established in 1967.

References 

Rugby union-related lists
Rugby union in Kenya